Bobbie Brebde (born 31 December 1970) is a Dutch water polo player. He competed in the men's tournament at the 2000 Summer Olympics.

References

1970 births
Living people
Dutch male water polo players
Olympic water polo players of the Netherlands
Water polo players at the 2000 Summer Olympics
Sportspeople from The Hague